Benediktas Vilmantas Rupeika (born 24 March 1944 in Telšiai District Municipality) is a Lithuanian politician. In 1990 he was among those who signed the Act of the Re-Establishment of the State of Lithuania.

References
Biography

1944 births
Living people
Members of the Seimas
People from Telšiai District Municipality
Vilnius University alumni
20th-century Lithuanian politicians